Neoflavonoids are a class of polyphenolic compounds. While flavonoids (in the narrow sense) have the 2-phenylchromen-4-one backbone, neoflavonoids have the 4-phenylchromen backbone with no hydroxyl group substitution at position 2.

Types

Neoflavonoids include 4-arylcoumarins (neoflavones), 4-arylchromanes, dalbergiones and dalbergiquinols.
 Neoflavones are derived from the 4-phenylcoumarin (or 4-aryl-coumarin) backbone (C15H12O2). The first neoflavone isolated from natural sources was calophyllolide from Calophyllum inophyllum seeds (1951). It is also known to found in bark and timber of Sri Lankan endemic plant Mesua thwaitesii.
 Neoflavenes possess the 4-phenylchromen backbone (C15H10O2). Dalbergichromene, extracted from the stem-bark and heartwood of Dalbergia sissoo, is an example of such compounds

Other examples
 Coutareagenin (5-hydroxy-7-methoxy-4-(3,4-dihydroxyphenyl)-2H-benzo-1-pyran-2-on) found in Hintonia latiflora
 Dalbergin
 Nivetin isolated from Echinops niveus

References

External links